Paraglaciecola psychrophila is a Gram-negative, psychrophilic and motile bacterium from the genus of Paraglaciecola which has been isolated from the Arctic.

References

External links
Type strain of Paraglaciecola psychrophila at BacDive -  the Bacterial Diversity Metadatabase

Bacteria described in 2006
Alteromonadales